Qianling Mountain is an inner-city mountain located at Guiyang, Guizhou, China. The mountain's name refers to Qian, which is the short name of Guizhou province. As an inner-city mountain, its attractions include a temperate forest and lake.

Mountains 
The list of mountains included Zhangti, Baota, Tiyu, Santai, Shiyu, Xiangwang, Daluo and Tanshan. The Daluo mountain is the highest among them, with an elevation of 1500 m.

History 
The first Buddhist temple was built in 1672 by the 33rd generation of the Linji Buddhist Chisong monk. The temple is named Hongfu temple, which in Chinese means the massiveness of Buddha's blessing. The temple is visited by thousands of tourists and worshipers daily.

Attractions 

 "9 turn" hike to the Hongfu temple
 Hongfu temple
 Mountain top view of the Guiyang city
 Qianling zoo
 Kylin cave
 Qianling Lake
 Monkey park

References

External links 
 Qianling Park

Mountains of Guizhou
Tourist attractions in Guiyang